Tippecanoe may refer to several places or things in the United States:

 The 1811 Battle of Tippecanoe in Indiana
 A nickname for William Henry Harrison (U.S. President March 1841–April 1841) from his role in the battle
 Tippecanoe and Tyler too, an 1840 slogan and song based partly on this nickname
Curse of Tippecanoe, the pattern where each American president who won an election in a year ending in zero from 1840 to 1960 died in office
 Treaty of Tippecanoe, an 1832 agreement between the United States government and Native American tribes in Indiana

Places 
 Tippecanoe, Indiana, an unincorporated town
 Tippecanoe Place, mansion built in South Bend, Indiana, by Clement Studebaker 
 Tippecanoe, Ohio, an unincorporated town
 Tippecanoe County, Indiana
 Tippecanoe River in Indiana
 Tippecanoe River State Park in Indiana
 Tippecanoe Township (disambiguation), five in Indiana and one in Iowa
 The original (but disputed) name for Tipp City, Ohio
 Tippecanoe High School in Tipp City, Ohio
 Tippecanoe Lake, a glacially-created lake in Kosciusko County, Indiana
 Tippecanoe Battlefield Park, the location of the Battle of Tippecanoe fought on November 7, 1811

Ships 
 USS Tippecanoe, the name of several United States Navy ships
 USNS Tippecanoe (T-AO-199), a United States Navy fleet replenishment oiler in service since 1993

Miscellaneous 
 Tippecanoe Open, a golf tournament on the LPGA Tour from 1959 to 1961
 Tippecanoe School Corporation, administrator of 18 high schools, middle schools and elementary schools in Tippecanoe County, Indiana
 Tippecanoe County Courthouse, Lafayette, Indiana
 Tippecanoe (train), a passenger train operated by the Monon Railroad between Chicago and Indianapolis
 Tippecanoe station, a planned train station in San Bernardino, California